Destroyer Squadron 22, often abbreviated as DESRON 22, is a squadron of warships of the United States Navy. It is an operational component of Carrier Strike Group Two. The squadron was formed in March 1943, and later was one of the first two squadrons of Arleigh Burke-class destroyers. Its unofficial motto is “The Fighting Double Duece.”

Assigned ships
The squadron is currently made up of the following ships:

References

External links

Destroyer squadrons of the United States Navy